The 7th Parliament of Antigua and Barbuda was elected on Thursday, 24 April 1980, and was dissolved on Thursday, 29 March 1984.

It was the first parliament of an independent Antigua and Barbuda, and the last one elected as a British colony.

The only member of this parliament that is a member of the current parliament is Robin Yearwood.

Members

Senate 
Unknown

House of Representatives 
Speaker: Hon. Casford L. Murray

References 

Parliaments of Antigua and Barbuda